Persicaria tinctoria is a species of flowering plant in the buckwheat family. Common names include Chinese indigo and Japanese indigo. It is native to Eastern Europe and Asia.

The leaves were a source of indigo dye. It was already in use in the Western Zhou period (c. 1045–771 B.C.), and was the most important blue dye in East Asia until the arrival of Indigofera from the south.

See also 
 Indigofera tinctoria

References

Gallery 

 
tinctoria
Flora of Europe
Plants described in 1789
Flora of Asia
Plant dyes